The southern spotted box turtle (Terrapene nelsoni nelsoni) is a species of turtle in the  family Emydidae. It is endemic to Sierra Madre Occidental in Mexico.

References

Sources
 Terrapene nelsoni nelsoni

Reptiles of Mexico
Terrapene